Landwehr is a village and a former municipality in the district of Hildesheim in Lower Saxony, Germany. Since 1 November 2016, it is part of the municipality Freden.

References

Hildesheim (district)
Former municipalities in Lower Saxony